Majid Ansari (born in 1954 in Khanuk, Kerman Province) is an Iranian politician and cleric. He is currently member of the Expediency Discernment Council. He was formerly Vice President for Legal Affairs from July 12, 2016 until August 9, 2017. Previously held vice presidency in parliamentary affairs from October 12, 2004 to August 29, 2005, appointed by President Mohammad Khatami and the second term from September 1, 2013 until July 12, 2016 under President Hassan Rouhani. On 2 August 2017, Ansari announced that he will not be part of second Rouhani government.

Ansari is also a former representative to the Assembly of Experts and a current member of the Expediency Discernment Council. Politically, he is a member of the Central Council of Association of Combatant Clerics.

Previously, he has been a representative of Tehran in the Parliament of Iran until 2004. Ansari has openly supported Sadegh Khalkhali, the hanging judge and his serial executions.

References

Iranian Islamic religious leaders
Vice Presidents of Iran for Parliamentary Affairs
Living people
Association of Combatant Clerics politicians
Members of the Expediency Discernment Council
Members of the Assembly of Experts
1954 births
Members of the 5th Islamic Consultative Assembly
Members of the 6th Islamic Consultative Assembly
Iranian wardens
Vice Presidents of Iran for Legal Affairs
Heads of reformist fractions in Islamic Consultative Assembly